Penicillium westlingii is a species of fungus in the genus Penicillium which was isolated from soil near Poznan in Poland. Penicillium westlingii produces citrinin and sterol.

References

Further reading 
 

westlingii
Fungi described in 1927